Inuvik was a territorial electoral district representing the city of Inuvik, Northwest Territories. It was dissolved for the 1999 territorial election, with two new districts, Inuvik Boot Lake and Inuvik Twin Lakes. Its last sitting Member was Floyd Roland, who now represents Inuvik Boot Lake.

Former electoral districts of Northwest Territories
Inuvik